John Hoolan (1842 – 15 June 1911) was an Australian politician. He was the Labour member for Burke in the Legislative Assembly of Queensland from 1890 to 1894 and from 1896 to 1899.

He was also leader of the Labour Party in Queensland between 1893 and 1894.

Hoolan died in 1911 and was buried in Toowong Cemetery.

References 

1842 births
1911 deaths
Members of the Queensland Legislative Assembly
Burials at Toowong Cemetery
Australian Labor Party members of the Parliament of Queensland